John Garnett may refer to:

John Garnett (bishop) (died 1782), English bishop of Clogher in the Church of Ireland
John B. Garnett (born 1940), mathematician
John Armstrong Garnett (1767–1831), president of the Royal College of Surgeons in Ireland